Kanowit is a district, in Sibu Division, Sarawak, Malaysia. The seat of this district is the town of Kanowit.

References